The 2005–06 FIBA EuroCup was the 3rd season of the FIBA EuroCup, the third-strongest pan-European club basketball competition. A total number of 32 teams from 20 countries participated in competition. The season finished with the EuroCup Final Four, which was held in Kyiv, Ukraine. Joventut Badalona won the cup after defeating BC Khimki 88–63 in the final.

Format
A number of 32 teams were split into 8 groups of four teams each. The top two teams in each group advanced to the next stage, where they were split into new four groups of four. The top two teams in each group in the second group stage advanced to the Quarter-Final, which was played in a Best-of-three playoff system. The winner of each series advanced to the 2006 EuroCup Final Four, which was held in Kyiv.

Teams

Regular season

Group A

Group B

Group C

Group D

Group E

Group F

Group G

Group H

Second stage

Group I

Group J

Group K

Group L

Quarterfinals

Final Four

Bracket

See also

 2005-06 Euroleague
 2005-06 ULEB Cup
 2005–06 FIBA EuroCup Challenge

External links
Official site
At Eurobasket.com

Euro
FIBA EuroChallenge seasons